Samuel Sherwood (April 24, 1779 – October 31, 1862) was a United States Representative from New York.

Biography
Sherwood was born in Kingsbury, New York on April 24, 1779.  He completed preparatory studies, began the study of law at the age of fifteen in Kingston, and moved to Delhi in 1798, where he continued his legal studies. He was admitted to the bar in 1800 and practiced in Delhi.  Sherwood's home near the confluence of the West Branch Delaware River and Little Delaware River included a farm, and he was also involved in local business ventures, including a tannery and a grist mill.

In addition to his legal and business interests, Sherwood was active in the New York Militia as paymaster of Colonel Elisha Butler's regiment.

Sherwood was elected as a Federalist to the Thirteenth Congress (March 4, 1813 to March 3, 1815). He was not a candidate for renomination to the Fourteenth Congress and resumed the practice of his profession in Delhi,

In 1814, Sherwood married Laura Bostwick of New Milford, Connecticut.

In 1830 Sherwood moved to New York City, where he continued to practice law until retiring in 1858.

Sherwood died in New York City on October 31, 1862. He was buried at Woodland Cemetery in Delhi.

References

Samuel Sherwood Obituary in the New York Times

External links 
 

1779 births
1862 deaths
People from Kingsbury, New York
New York (state) lawyers
Federalist Party members of the United States House of Representatives from New York (state)
19th-century American lawyers